William Heysham Overend  (5 October 185118 March 1898) was a notable British marine artist and book illustrator who died prematurely in 1898.

Early life

William Heysham Overend was born on 5 October 1851 in Coatham, County Durham. Many sources state that his birthplace was Coatham, North Yorkshire near Middlesbrough. However, it seems more likely that his birthplace was Coatham Mundeville near Darlington, as:

His birth was registered in Darlington, Durham.
He was baptised in St Cuthbert's Church, Darlington, less than 6.5 km from Coatham Mundeville.
He and his parents gave Darlington as his birthplace on census returns.
Mayhew's statement that he was born miles inland (Coatham in Yorkshire is on the coast).

His parents were James Overend (18212 November 1875), a flax spinner, born in Bentham, Yorkshire, and Martha née Hodgson (18241886), born in Hawkshead, Lancashire and the daughter of Braithwaite Hodgson, a wealthy landowner. The family lived in Priestgate, Darlington in the 1850s, but the 1861 census found them living at No, 2, Buccleuch Terrace, Hackney. By now, his father was a railway contractor.

Overend was educated at both Charterhouse School, where he only spent one year, and Bruce Castle School, where he remained until 1867. He was already showing early promise as Athol states that a sketch drawn by him at age 14, of a boarding party, would not have disgraced a student of the Royal Academy.

After leaving Bruce Castle School in the summer of 1857, Overend spend the next three years in the studio of Davis Cooper, son of Abraham Cooper . Here he went through the traditional course of art training, but continued to teach himself after leaving the studio. By 1871, he was a lodger, with the profession of artist (painter), together with Edward Overend, an unemployed Naval Engineer, in a small lodging house at 14 Clapton Terrace in Hackney, London.

Work

Overend found it difficult at first to earn his living as a painter. His first successful submission to the Royal Academy was in 1872, and by 1880 he had exhibited twice with both the Royal Academy and the Society of British Artists. He continued to exhibit throughout his life, including at the Royal Academy, The Society of British Artists, the Royal Society of Painters in Oils, Liverpool, Glasgow, 1891 Naval Exhibition, and the 1883 World Columbian Exhibition.

Beginning as a painter, Overend moved into illustration. His connection with the Illustrated London News began in 1875 when he illustrated the Sir George Nares Artic expedition. For the next decade at least he was second only to Richard Caton Woodville as an illustrator for the paper. Overend also illustrated articles in The English Illustrated Magazine from 1891, Good Words from 1894, The Rambler from 1897, The Pall Mall Magazine, and the juvenile periodicals The Boy's Own Paper, and Chums from 1892, Overend also drew for The Illustrated Naval and Military Magazine, The Graphic, The Magazine of Art, and The Leisure Hour, London Society, St. Nicholas, and The Penny Illustrated Paper.

Overend's work was characterised by thoroughness. He maintained a stock of uniforms and weapons to serve as models for his drawings. During the 1891 Naval Exhibition at Chelsesa (2 May 1891October 1891) he loaned the following to the exhibition from his collection:

9 assorted Naval officers swords and Midshipmen's dirks
A 1:48 scale model of a Frigate
9 assorted Naval and Marine coats and hats
Various paintings including a coloured sheet of 12 figures in Navy costumes for 1854

Overend was not just an artist, but an engraver. He records his occupation as steel engraver in the 1891 census. Newbolt notes that Overend probably carved the woodcuts for some of his illustrations, including for the six illustrations for G. A. Henty's A Chapter of Adventures.

Overend was elected a member of the Royal Institute of Painters in Oils on 27 January 1886. He was elected to the Council of the Navy Records Society in 1897. These two elections illustrate that his work was recognised not only by his artistic peers, but also by naval historians.

Ship illustrations
One of the strangest things about Overend is that he was a landsman, bred and born. He was b miles from the coast, and had no relatives in either the merchant or naval service, yet his knowledge of past and present ships of war was matched by few sailors. The following illustrations were drawn by Overend for the Illustrated Naval and Military Magazine in 1884 for articles on the development of naval warfare.

An August Morning with Farragut

An August morning with Farragut; the Battle of Mobile Bay, 5 August 1864 is Overend's greatest work. The painting is enormous, being 3.048m (10 feet) wide by 1.969m (6 feet 5½ inches) high. It was painted in oils on canvas. Overend was commissioned by the Fine Art Society, an art gallery with showrooms in London and Glasgow, to produce a painting of a naval battle of the American Civil War. Kirkpatrick states that Overend was commissioned to paint Admiral Porter's conquest of New Orleans, and that the Farragut painting was additional. Kirkpatrick further states that the Farragut painting was painted while Overend was in the United States. However, Mayhew, who was a colleague of Overend's, makes no reference to the New Orleans painting, but states that from the first the commission was for what became the Farragut painting, he also states that the work was painted in Overend's Ormond Street studio in London.

Overend attacked the commission with his usual thoroughness. He left Liverpool for New York, arriving on the RMS Scythia on 4 October 1882. Knowing virtually no-one in the United States, but supplied with letters of introduction from the US Minister in London to the navy department at Washington, he went vigorously to work to collect his material. He visited the ship to sketch it. He collected naval uniforms, plans, arms, sketches, photographs, and studies. He interviewed survivors and enlisted the aid of Farragut's son, a Naval Captain, in his researches. Overend painted the officers and men from photographs taken after their arrival in New Orleans.

Overend returned to London with all the reference material he had collected to paint the picture. While in the United States Overend visited the 1883 Columbian Exhibition in Chicago where he exhibited a painting, Victory!: the Prize Crew taking possession, and some drawings.

The title of the work, and even the work itself, were both drawn from a vivid account of the battle of Mobile harbour by J. C. Kinney which was published in the June 1881 edition of Scribner's Magazine under the title An August Morning with Farragut. The incident described in the painting can briefly be described as follows. On the morning of 4 August 1864 Admiral Farragut's fleet, consisting of 14 ships and four monitors forced their way past the forts protecting Mobile Bay. The Admiral was about his flagship, the Hartford, a wooden hulled combined steam-and-sail ship. On 5 August 1864, the steam-powered ironclad Confederate ram CSS Tennessee, the flagship of the small Confederate fleet of four ships, attempted to ram the Hartford. It struck the Hartford a glancing blow on the port bow and then the ships ground past each other, the moment captured in the painting. In the painting, the observer seems to be at the port taffrail amidships on the Hartford, looking backwards towards the wheel and quarter-deck. The Tenessessee is grinding along the port side of the Hartford moving deeper into the scene. Farragut is shown standing on the quarter-rail holding onto the rigging, where tradition holds that the lashed himself on in case he were hit.

Overend returned from America and painted the work in his painting in 1883 in his Ormonde Street Studio. The Pall Mall Gazette of 1 November 1883 announced that the Fine Art Society would shortly be selling prints of the painting. The painting was on display in the premises of James S Earle and Sons, in Philadelphia in September 1884. In 1885 G. A. R. Dorchester were selling prints of the painting for 25 cents each.

The painting was valued at $4,000 when it was displayed in at an art dealer's in Buffalo, New York in May 1885. It was also displayed in other towns throughout the US including Cedar Rapids, Iowa, and finally in Hartford, Connecticutin January 1886. Hartford was the town for which Farragut's flagship was named.

By February the local newspaper, the Hartford Courant, had already begun a campaign to purchase the picture for Hartford, with the intent to donate the painting the free picture gallery in the Wadsworth Atheneum. The newspaper estimated the painting was worth $10,000 but could be obtained for about one third of this price. Three subscribers had already contributed $100 each to the fund. The subscription was successful as the painting was hung in the Wadsworth Athenaeum in c. May 1886.

Book illustration
Kirkpatrick lists over 100 books illustrated by Overend for over four dozen authors. The authors he illustrated for included:

E. M. Alford (18411905), an English poet and writer of historical fiction
Sir Reginald Bacon (18631947), a Royal Navy Admiral who wrote mostly about naval issues
F. C. Beames (18631944), an English author of books for young children
M. Bramston (18411912), an author of 40 or so religious-themed novels
Robert Williams Buchanan (18411901), a Scottish poet, dramatist, and novelist
Marion Clifford Butler (18411919), an English baroness who wrote fiction for girls
Mrs. Henry Clarke (18531908), who wrote historical fiction and children's books
Harry Collingwood (18431922), a writer of boys' adventure fiction, usually in a nautical setting
F. Norreys Connell (18741948), an Irish dramatist, novelist, and man of letters
Charles H. Eden (18391900), a public servant and writer on travel and of over a dozen novels
A. Eubule Evans (18391896), an Anglican cleric and popular novelist, including tract novels for the SPCK
George Manville Fenn (18311909), a prolific author of fiction for young adults
Sir Samuel Ferguson (18101886), an Irish poet, whose interest in Irish mythology and early Irish history was a forerunner of the Irish Literary Revival
H. O. Arnold-Forster (18551909), a British politician and writer who served as Secretary of State for War (19031905)
Thomas Frost (18211908), an English radical journalist and writer
Charles Alan Fyffe (18451892), an English historian and journalist
Evelyn Everett-Green (18561932), a prolific English novelist who wrote about 350 book, beginning first with pious stories, then historical fiction for girls, and eventually moved to adult romantic fiction
Bret Harte (18361902), an American short-story writer and poet
Nellie Hellis (18531930), Helena Jane Hellis, a writer of books for children with a Christian message, and a popular lecturer on Dickens
G. A. Henty (18321902), a prolific writer of boy's adventure fiction, often set in a historical context, who had himself served in the military and been a war correspondent
Edward N. Hoare (18421909), a clergyman with the same name as his father, who wrote improving books and books on historical topics
John C. Hutcheson (18401897), a British writer about life at sea
Henry Kingsley (18301876), an English novelist, editor, and war correspondent, a brother to Charles Kingsley
Laura M. Lane (18461929), Lauretta Caroline Maria Luffman, an English writer and women's activist who mainly wrote stories for girls, moved to Australia and became a journalist
C. E. M.
Catherine Mary MacSorley (18481929), an Irish writer of religious books and stories for girls
Frederick Marryat (17921848), a Royal Navy officer who wrote adventure books for children
Herman Melville (18191891), an American novelist, short-story writer, and poet who wrote Moby Dick
Frank Frankfort Moore (18551931), an Irish journalist, playwright, novelist, poet, and biographer
Mary Onley (18351908), an English schoolmistress and author of children's books
Ella Edersheim Overton (18641947), who contributed to religious-themed magazines and published two novels
Edgar T. Pickering, a writer of boys' adventure books and a prolific writer of stories for boys' magazines
Charles Napier Robinson (18491938), a Royal Naval officer who on retirement, became a journalist on naval matters and published the journal Navy and army illustrated : a magazine descriptive and illustrative of everyday life in the defensive service of the British Empire
William Clark Russell (18441911), an English writer, best known for his novels in nautical settings
Samuel Whitchurch Sadler (18211886), a retired paymaster-in-chief of the Royal Navy wrote juvenile fiction, mostly on nautical topics
Walter Scott (17711832), the Scottish historical novelist, poet, and historian who wrote Ivanhoe
Mary Shipley (18431914), wrote children's fiction with a moral, mostly for the SPCK
Helen Shipton (18571945), wrote children's fiction with a moral, almost exclusively for the SPCK, as well as some plays in later life
Sydney Mary Sitwell (18401908), a novelist who also wrote a standard text on the growth of English colonies
Catherine E. Smith, wrote children's fiction with a moral, mostly for the SPCK
George Smith (18311895), a philanthropist who campaigned against industrial child labour and for the decent treatment of Gypsies
Robert Southey (17741843), an English poet and writer, one of the Lake Poets
Gordon Stables (18401910), a Scottish medical doctor in the Royal Navy who wrote boys' adventure fiction
Herbert S. Sweetland (18591905), a writer and artist who wrote fairy tales, novels and short stories
Benjamin Waugh (18391908), a social reformer who founded the UK's National Society for the Prevention of Cruelty to Children
Edward Whymper (18401911), an English explorer, mountaineer, illustrator, and author; brother to Frederick Whymper
Frederick Whymper (18381901), an English artist and explorer; brother to Edward Whymper
Beech Wood, who wrote children's fiction with a moral, mostly for the SPCK
G. Robert Wynne (18381912), an Irish cleric, who wrote on the Anglican church as well as a few moral stories for children

Example of book illustration for juvenile fiction
The following illustrations were drawn for A Chapter of Adventures (1890) by G. A. Henty. These were wood-cuts, and Newbolt suggests that Overend did his own engraving for the woodcuts he did for Blackie.

Example of book illustration for adult fiction
Overend illustrated not only juvenile fiction, but also books for adults, such as George Smith's campaigning book about the treatment of Gypsies or William Clark Russell's novel A Strange Elopement (1892) in which a young man carries off, in mid-ocean, a young woman from the custody of the most truculent and vigilant of fathers. This had first appeared as a serial in The English Illustrated Magazine, starting with the October 1891 edition.

Death
Overend died at his residence, 17 Southampton Street (now named Conway Street), Fitzroy Square, in London, on the evening of Friday, 18 March 1898. The death certificate gave a number of causes of death including Locomotor ataxia which is often a symptom of tertiary syphilis. Other causes included Catarrh of the Bowels (diarrhoea), and Albuminuria, an indicator of kidney disease. His doctor stated that he had been suffering for ten years. The columnist on the Penny Illustrated Paper noted that Overend had never been strong since he injured his leg, and that he had complained of Catarrh of the Bowels the last time he had dropped a drawing off at the Illustrated London News. He was buried on Wednesday, 23 March 1898 in Tottenham Cemetery. His estate was valued at over £3,000, a very respectable sum for the period.

Assessment

Despite his early death "he did a prodigious amount of work in his comparatively short life". An obituary in the Army and Navy Gazette noted that "he was recognized as the foremost exponent of naval art, the only man who could at once satisfy his brother artists, the student of naval history, and the professional seaman . . . His knowledge of the detail of the old ships was unequalled, and his accuracy in matters naval, both archaeological and of the present day, was proverbial. Modest, unassuming, and amiable, no man was more cordially liked by his professional brethren, while the high appreciation in which he was held by those who cherish naval art and literature was shown by his election to the council of the Navy Records Society."

The headmaster of Charterhouse, twenty years after Overend left the school, wrote to him to request material for the Greyfriars magazine, produced by former pupils, and referred to him as "the most distinguished draughtsman the school had ever turned out." The Arts Club said of him: "A painter and black-and-white artist of great ability; held in affection by every member of the club." This was not a graveside eulogy, but a description of him more than 20 years after his death.

Notes

References

External links
 

Books illustrated by Overend in Jisc Library Hub Discover
An August Morning with Farragut: The Battle of Mobile Bay, August 5, 1864 at the Wadsworth Atheneum Museum of Art
Overend's biography at Aberystwyth University.
A painting by Overend at the [Royal Museums Greenwich. The museum also holds an additional 11 illustrations, but these are not online.
The Bear Alley Blog on Overend Written by Robert J. Kirkpatrick, this included a long bibliography of books illustrated by Overend.
A partial lists of books illustrated by Overend at the Hathi Trust
A Strange Elopement online at the British Library
Listing for Overend at the Online Books Page

1851 births
1898 deaths
People from Darlington
People educated at Charterhouse School
People educated at Bruce Castle School
Members of the Royal Institute of Oil Painters
Marine artists
British marine artists
British illustrators
British children's book illustrators
Magazine illustrators
Deaths from syphilis